Michael Mead (born 4 June 1956) is a professional ballroom dance champion and choreographer.

Biography
Michael Mead, born in Croydon, England, spent his early years traveling with his family and attending schools overseas. At 18, done with school and unsure of what he wished to do professionally, Michael decided to try his hand at accounting.  After quickly establishing that perhaps the last thing he wished was to spend the rest of his life auditing, Michael enrolled in a teacher training class at a local dance studio, and was offered a job after only six months of dance training.

The lust for travel instilled in Michael in his early years soon took hold, ultimately leading him to California, where he opened Londance, now one of the top competitive dance studios in the U.S., in Costa Mesa, California.  Though Michael sold his ownership share in 1989 in order to concentrate on the serious pursuit of a competitive dance career, he continues to teach there (and at Champion Ballroom Academy in San Diego) to this day.

Dance career
Michael formed a professional partnership with Toni Redpath and developed a unique style that ultimately led them to setting a record by winning the Open Championships 4 years in a row (undefeated throughout) before retiring from competition in 2002. On September 28, 2000, Toni and Michael were married on the island of Kauai.  Currently the couple are based in San Diego and coach many of the U.S. top competitive couples, as well as judging for competitions and traveling the world doing shows.

TV and Film
Michael and Toni have made numerous appearances on TV and film.  Most notable TV credits are as choreographers on FOX So You Think You Can Dance, featured dancers and champions on PBS America's Ballroom Challenge and Championship Ballroom Dancing, and in the feature film Dance with Me.

Choreography for So You Think You Can Dance

Achievements
 Four Time Undefeated U.S. Ballroom Champions: 1999, 2000, 2001, 2002
 World DanceSport Classic Showdance Champions Finalists
 National Professional Rising Star Champions: 1998
 Canadian Open American Ballroom Champions: 2000, 2001
 National Showdance Championships Runners Up: 2001

See also
U.S. National Dancesport Champions (Professional Smooth)
So You Think You Can Dance (US)
Toni Redpath

References

External links
 
 DanceSport Competitions
 Champion Ballroom Academy
 So You Think You Can Dance (Fox)

British ballroom dancers
English male dancers
Living people
People from Croydon
So You Think You Can Dance choreographers
1956 births

no:Toni Redpath og Michael Mead